LPT is the designation of a parallel port interface on some computer systems.

LPT may refer to:

Finance 
 Listed property trust, an Australian real estate investment trust
 Local property tax (Ireland)

Science and technology 
 Lagrangian particle tracking, in computational fluid dynamics
 Leptotes (plant), an orchid genus
 Line printer, a type of computer printer
 Longest-processing-time-first scheduling, a multi-processor job scheduling method
 Low Power Transceiver experiment, on the Space Shuttle

Other uses 
 East Coast Expressway (Lebuhraya Pantai Timur), Malaysia
 Little Princess Trust, a UK charity

See also
 LPT1-LPT4, DOS device driver names for parallel printers